The 1909 Italian Football Championship season was won by Pro Vercelli.

In this season, as in the previous one, two championships of Prima Categoria were played:
Federal Championship, the first tournament where foreign players (if they lived in Italy) were also allowed to play; the winners would be proclaimed Campioni Federali (Federal Champions)
Italian Championship, the second tournament where only Italian players were allowed to play; the winners would be proclaimed Campioni Italiani (Italian Champions)

The winner of Federal Championship was Pro Vercelli. They won as a prize Coppa Oberti.

The winner of Italian Championship was Juventus. They won as a prize Coppa Buni.

However, the "spurious international teams" (the clubs composed mostly of foreign players), adversing the autarchical policy of the FIF, decided to withdraw from Italian Championship in order to make the Federal competition the most relevant tournament and to diminish the Italian one. More, Pro Vercelli's victory of the Federal Championship (where Juventus was soon eliminated) with an all-Italian squad transformed the Italian Championship into a meaningless tournament. The dissenters' strategy worked out: the failure of the Italian Championship won by Juventus forced the Federation to later recognized the Federal Champions of Pro Vercelli as "Campioni d'Italia 1909", disavowing the other tournament.

Federal Championship

Qualifications

Liguria
Played on January 17 and February 7

|}

Tie-break
Played on February 21 on neutral ground

|}

Lombardy
Classification

Results
Played on January 10, 17 and 24

Piedmont

Round 1
Played on January 10 and 17

|}

Due to the fact that both teams won a match (aggregate total was not applied), a tie break was needed.

Repetition
Played on January 24 on Juventus ground

|}

Torino advanced to Round 2.

Round 2
Played on February 7 and March 14

|}

Veneto
Venezia was the only registered team.

Semifinals

Lombardy-Veneto
Played on February 21 and March 28

|}

Piedmont-Liguria
Played on March 21 and 28

|}

Final
Played on April 4 and 25

|}

Italian Championship
1909 Italian Championship of Football

References and sources

Almanacco Illustrato del Calcio - La Storia 1898-2004, Panini Edizioni, Modena, September 2005
Carlo Chiesa, La grande storia del calcio italiano Chapter 2: Juve, scippati due titoli! Inter, l'atroce beffa (1908-1910), pp. 17–32, Guerin Sportivo #5, May 2012.
Digitalized online archive of Turin newspaper La Stampa.

1909
 
1908–09 in European association football leagues